The Lone Mountain Formation is a geologic formation in Utah.

It preserves fossils dating back to the Silurian period.

See also 
 Lone Mountain Dolomite — Silurian formation in Nevada
 List of fossiliferous stratigraphic units in Utah
 Paleontology in Utah

References 

Geologic formations of Utah
Silurian System of North America
Silurian geology of Utah
Silurian southern paleotemperate deposits
Silurian southern paleotropical deposits